Saunderson v Purchase [1958] NZLR 588 is a cited case in New Zealand regarding the joining of two documents to form a written contract under the Contracts Enforcement Act [1956], and reinforces the English case of Timmins v Moreland Street Property Co Ltd [1958] Ch 110.

References

High Court of New Zealand cases
New Zealand contract case law
1958 in case law
1958 in New Zealand